Chaplin Cinema was the oldest single screen movie theatre in Kolkata, West Bengal, India. It was located in 5/1 Chowringhee Place. In 1907 Jamshedji Framji Madan opened this cinema in India.

History 
In 1907 Jamshedji Framji Madan established the Elphinstone Picture Palace. In this theatre father of Uttam Kumar used to run the projector. It was later renamed to Minerva cinema (not to be confused with Minerva Theatre). The condition of the movie theatre deteriorated over decades before the Calcutta Municipal Corporation overhauled it, and christened in Chaplin in 1980s. The theatre was demolished by the municipal corporation in 2013 after remaining non-functional for several years.

See also 
 Cinemas in Kolkata
 Globe Cinema (Kolkata)

References

External links 
 Milestones in Bollywood Cinema

Former cinemas
Cinemas in Kolkata